Thalassotalea coralli is a Gram-negative, aerobic, rod-shaped and motile bacterium from the genus of Thalassotalea which has been isolated from the coral Euphyllia glabrescens.

References

Alteromonadales
Bacteria described in 2018